Ramhlunchhunga (born 24 April 2001) is an Indian professional footballer who plays as a forward for I-League club Sreenidi Deccan, on loan from Indian Super League club Hyderabad.

Club career

Aizawl 
On 1 January 2020, Ramhlunchhunga was signed by Aizawl FC from Electric Veng.

He made his professional debut for the club against Gokulam Kerala FC, on 4 January 2020. He was brought in as substitute in the 92nd minute, as Aizawl FC drew 1–1.

On 27 December 2021, Ramhlunchhunga scored his first professional goal, against Real Kashmir FC, in a 3–2 loss.

Career statistics

Club

References

2001 births
Living people
People from Kolasib
Indian footballers
Aizawl FC players  
Footballers from Mizoram
I-League players
Association football midfielders